Jamaica competed at the 2019 World Athletics Championships in Doha, Qatar, from 27 September to 6 October 2019.

Medalists

* – Indicates the athlete competed in preliminaries but not the final

Results

Men 
Track and road events

* – Indicates the athlete competed in preliminaries but not the final

Field events

Women
Track and road events

* – Indicates the athlete competed in preliminaries but not the final

Field events

Mixed

* – Indicates the athlete competed in preliminaries but not the final

References

Nations at the 2019 World Athletics Championships
World Championships in Athletics
2019